Cistanthe guadalupensis is a species of flowering plant in the family Montiaceae. The plant is native to Guadalupe Island.

References

guadalupensis
Flora of Baja California
Flora of Mexican Pacific Islands